Hermann Knoll (10 December 1931 – 26 March 2015) was an Austrian ice hockey player. He competed in the men's tournaments at the 1956 Winter Olympics and the 1964 Winter Olympics. He also competed in the field hockey tournament at the 1952 Summer Olympics.

References

External links
 

1931 births
2015 deaths
Austrian male field hockey players
Olympic ice hockey players of Austria
Olympic field hockey players of Austria
Field hockey players at the 1952 Summer Olympics
Ice hockey players at the 1956 Winter Olympics
Ice hockey players at the 1964 Winter Olympics
Ice hockey people from Vienna